Visnadine (or visnadin) is a natural vasodilator.  It was first isolated from bishop's weed (Ammi visnaga), a plant indigenous to the Mediterranean region which has been used for centuries in Egypt as a spasmolytic.

References 

Lactones
Vasodilators
Pyranochromenes
Acetate esters